"" is the 35th single by Zard and released 9 April 2003 under B-Gram Records label. After one year, ZARD released new single. The single debuted at #4 rank first week. It charted for 8 weeks and sold over 62,000 copies.

Track list
All songs are written by Izumi Sakai

composer: Aika Ohno/arrangement: Satoru Kobayashi
the song was used in anime Detective Conan as 17th ending theme
OA(on air) version was arranged by Akihito Tokunaga, this version of song was released in 2012 Zard Album collection in Premium Disc

composer and arrangement: Akihito Tokunaga
 (original karaoke)

References

2003 singles
2003 songs
Zard songs
Case Closed songs
Songs written by Izumi Sakai
Songs written by Aika Ohno